Velile (born Velile Mchunu in 1973 in KwaMashu, Natal, South Africa) is a South African pop singer and musical actress. She became known in particular through the song "Helele", which was used by RTL (French radio) and the Swiss television in the coverage of the Football World Cup 2010 in South Africa, and in Germany as the leading actress in the Hamburg production of the musical The Lion King.

Biography 
Mchunu grew up in a township near the South African city of Durban and attended drama school at the "Committed Artist Academy" in Johannesburg. In 1999 she appeared with Stevie Wonder and Michael Jackson on the occasion of Nelson Mandela's birthday. In Hamburg, she played the main role of the shaman Rafiki in the musical "The Lion King" for several years. Next, she had appearances in the musical Sarafina as well as the 1992 South African film of the same name, about a young black South African struggling for freedom during the apartheid. She went on tour to undertake performances of the musicals Izidumo and Ipi Ntombi. She appeared also in 2006  tours as a soloist to various musicals.

In June 2022, she returned to the stage performing at the legendary club Anja's in Barmstedt, Germany. Singing her classic track Helele and Tina Turner songs among other things she received a warm welcome from an international audience.

Diskography

Albums 

 Tales from Africa (2010)
 Lion Queen (2011)

Singles 

 Helele (Velile & Safri Duo) (2010)
 Kuyabanda (2010)
 Injabulo (2011)

References

21st-century South African women singers
1973 births
Living people